Dutch Reformed Church may refer to:

Netherlands
 Dutch Reformed Church (NHK, from ), was a Christian denomination in the Netherlands before its 2004 merger into the Protestant Church in the Netherlands.

South Africa

In South Africa, it may refer to:
One of the Three Sister Churches of South Africa:
 Dutch Reformed Church in South Africa (NGK)
 Dutch Reformed Church in South Africa (NHK)
 Reformed Churches in South Africa (GK)
  Uniting Reformed Church in Southern Africa (Verenigende Gereformeerde Kerk in Suid-Afrika), a merger of the Dutch Reformed Church in Africa and the Dutch Reformed Mission Church
 Afrikaans Protestant Church (Afrikaanse Protestantse Kerk), a conservative Reformed church that broke from the Dutch Reformed Church in South Africa (NGK) in 1987

United States
Major United States denominations in the Dutch Reformed tradition include:
The Reformed Church in America
The Christian Reformed Church in North America
Protestant Reformed Churches in America
United Reformed Churches in North America

Individual churches:
Dutch Reformed Church (Harrodsburg, Kentucky), listed on the National Register of Historic Places in Mercer County, Kentucky
Fairfield Dutch Reformed Church, Fairfield Township, Essex County, New Jersey, listed on the NRHP in New Jersey
Reformed Dutch Church of Second River, Belleville, New Jersey, listed on the NRHP in New Jersey
Holmdel Dutch Reformed Church, Holmdel, New Jersey, listed on the NRHP in New Jersey
Dutch Reformed Church at Romopock, Mahwah, New Jersey, listed on the NRHP in New Jersey
Dutch Reformed Church (New Brunswick, New Jersey), listed on the National Register of Historic Places in Middlesex County, New Jersey
Dutch Reformed Church in the English Neighborhood, Ridgefield, New Jersey, listed on the NRHP in New Jersey
Dutch Reformed Church of Gansevoort, Gansevoort, New York, listed on the NRHP in New York
Leeds Dutch Reformed Church, Leeds, New York, listed on the NRHP in New York
Flatbush Dutch Reformed Church Complex, New York, New York, listed on the NRHP in New York
Flatlands Dutch Reformed Church, New York, New York, listed on the NRHP in New York 
Dutch Reformed Church (Newburgh, New York), listed on the National Register of Historic Places in Orange County, New York
Old Dutch Church of Sleepy Hollow, Sleepy Hollow, New York, listed on the National Register of Historic Places in Westchester County, New York as Dutch Reformed Church
Dingman's Ferry Dutch Reformed Church, Dingman's Ferry, Pennsylvania, listed on the National Register of Historic Places in Pike County, Pennsylvania.
Old Brick Reformed Church, Marlboro, New Jersey.
South Schraalenburgh Church, Bergenfield, New Jersey, listed on the National Register of Historic Places in Bergen County, New Jersey.
Schraalenburgh North Church, Dumont, New Jersey, listed on the National Register of Historic Places in Bergen County, New Jersey.
New North Reformed Low Dutch Church, Upper Saddle River, New Jersey, listed on the National Register of Historic Places in Bergen County, New Jersey.
Reformed Dutch Church of Blawenburg, Blawenburg, New Jersey, listed on the National Register of Historic Places in Somerset County, New Jersey.
Old Bergen Church, Jersey City, New Jersey, listed on the National Register of Historic Places in Hudson County, New Jersey.
Second Reformed Dutch Church, Newark, New Jersey, listed on the National Register of Historic Places in Essex County, New Jersey.